ν Hydri, Latinized as Nu Hydri, is a single star in the southern circumpolar constellation of Hydrus. It is orange-hued and faintly visible to the naked eye with an apparent visual magnitude of 4.76. This object is located approximately 331 light years from the Sun based on parallax, and is drifting further away with a radial velocity of +3 km/s. It is a member of the Ursa Major Moving Group of stars that share a common motion through space.

This is an aging giant star with a stellar classification of K3III. With the supply of hydrogen at its core exhausted, the star has expanded and cooled. At present it has 21 times the girth of the Sun. It is 2.4 billion years old with estimates of its mass ranging from 1.8 to 3.5 times the mass of the Sun. The star is radiating 184 times the Sun's luminosity from its swollen photosphere at an effective temperature of 4,612 K.

References

K-type giants
Hydrus (constellation)
Hydri, Nu
Durchmusterung objects
018293
013244
0872
Ursa Major Moving Group